Hey Vern, It's Ernest! is an American children's television program. It aired on Saturday mornings on CBS for one season in 1988. Each episode involved short sketches on a certain theme or scenario, featuring Ernest P. Worrell (Jim Varney), his unseen friend Vern, and various others. The filming locations were in Nashville, Tennessee and Burbank, California. It was a production of Ernest creator John Cherry's production company, The Emshell Producers' Group, in association with CBS, and was co-produced with DIC Enterprises. The series was later rerun on The Family Channel in the early 1990s.

Cast

Recurring sketches and characters
 Lonnie Don's School of Hollywood Sound Effects: A fictional sound effects wizard demonstrates how to make a sound from one of his movies. His name is a pun of the phrase "la de da". The procedure is always the same: he places the meaty part of his hand over his mouth and blows a raspberry.
 Haircut: Ernest walks into Earl the Barber's shop and asks him to make him look like a "Wall Street tycoon". However, the barber always misunderstands him, and instead fanatically styles his hair into something that rhymes with the word "tycoon" (e.g., a "baby baboon", a "clock set on noon", "large feet in a cartoon", a "deadbeat raccoon", etc.) Whatever the hairstyle is, Ernest initially is aghast, but then stares at it thoughtfully in the mirror and says, "It could work".
 Sergeant Glory: Varney plays a fast-talking military Sergeant teaching a class of recruits about the subject of the day. He gives them two rules to remember, the second of which is almost always "Obey all rules". The character originated in an ad for Purity milk a short while before the character of Ernest was created (in "Hobbies", the rules were both "They seldom stand").
 My Father the Clown: A spoof on family-friendly sitcoms which featured a professional clown, his stay-at-home wife, and two kids: an aspiring clown (Skeeter) and his strait-laced brother (Eddie) who is routinely the victim of the antics.
 Existo the Magician: A clumsy magician who stumbles over his words, and attempts to perform tricks that always go awry. He is absent in the episode "Food". Existo would become the title character in a 1999 underground film, with Arntson reprising his role.
 Matt Finish: A self-described "photographer at large" who loves taking pictures of everything. His name is a pun on matte finish, a type of non-glossy photo paper.
 Mrs. Simon Simmons' Mind Your Manners: A spoof of Emily Post, Mrs. Simon Simmons teaches the ways of proper etiquette, but in many cases, breaks other norms of social protocol in the process. She is absent in the episode "Pets", "Food", and "School".
 Ernest's Tongue: Ernest's tongue talks about certain tongue related things and gets sprayed with different kinds of food.
 Mac and George: Mac and his "roommate" George, an Iguana who supposedly can do many of the same things a person can.
 Chuck and Bobby: Chuck and his brother Bobby (who rarely speaks), get themselves into various adventures. These two characters made appearances together in Ernest Saves Christmas as the Orlando Airport's storage agents and Ernest Goes to Jail as  security guards for a bank while Bobby made an appearance with his younger brother, Tom in Ernest Scared Stupid. Bobby's final film appearance was in Ernest Goes to School.
 Willie the Robot: A homemade robot with a bucket head and a '70s "Have a nice day" Smiley face. The robot originally appeared in Dr. Otto and the Riddle of the Gloom Beam.
 Baby Ernest: Ernest as a baby (Varney's head in a Marc Weiner-style head puppet) notes his confusion when he overhears his parents use a figure of speech and takes it literally, concluding each time with the phrase "Boy, grownups sure talk funny. KnowhatImean?"
 Woody: A ventriloquist dummy who looks like Ernest.
 Dust Bunny: A dusty rabbit, named after dust bunnies, who appears to live under dusty furniture, and always gets in and out of the picture by sneezing.
 Dr. Otto: The main character from Dr. Otto and the Riddle of the Gloom Beam would sometimes be featured in his lab creating new things. When he feels he has a great idea, he would sometimes exclaim "Viola!" ("Voila!") or "Eureka, California!" ("Eureka!")
 Auntie Nelda: A cantankerous old woman, a regular in Carden & Cherry's other commercials and films, who appears in at least one sketch each episode.
 Bill and Coo: A country music duo who sing sad but funny songs. They only appeared in two episodes, "Pets" and "School".

Episodes

Releases
Various episodes were released on home video in the late 1980s-early 1990s.

DIC streamed several episodes for free viewing on their KEWL Cartoons website until KewlCartoons became Jaroo.

Mill Creek Entertainment released a two-disc DVD set containing all thirteen episodes on January 18, 2011. This release has been discontinued and is out of print. Mill Creek later re-released the complete series set on DVD in February 2017.

As of 2019, the complete series is available for streaming on Tubi.

Awards

References

External links
 

1980s American children's comedy television series
1980s American sketch comedy television series
1988 American television series debuts
1988 American television series endings
American television shows featuring puppetry
CBS original programming
Children's sketch comedy
Television series by DIC Entertainment
Works based on advertisements